Lex Land (born ) is an American singer-songwriter and jazz vocalist from Los Angeles, currently residing in Austin, Texas. She was a contestant on the second season of NBC's singing competition The Voice. Land also fronts three other projects: Moorhaunter, One Big Dark Room, and The Kremer Land Swing Band.

Intelligent Noise Records released her first two albums, Orange Days on Lemon Street in 2008, and Were My Sweetheart to Go... in 2011. Both albums had songs featured on television programs.

In 2009, she performed as the last live in-studio guest for NBC's Last Call With Carson Daly. She has performed live twice on Los Angeles station KCRW's Morning Becomes Eclectic: once in 2009 and again in 2011.

Personal life
Land is the daughter of Dexter Holland, lead singer of the American punk rock band The Offspring.

Discography
Orange Days on Lemon Street (Studio album, 2008)
Lex Land: Live from KCRW (Live album, 2009)
Were My Sweetheart to Go (Studio album, 2011)
"Santa Baby" (Single, 2011)
"I Can't Make You Love Me (The Voice Performance)" (Single, 2012)
A Valentine EP (Studio album, 2018)

Background vocals
"Build Me This" Joshua James, 2009
"The Path You Came Here By" Jordan Moser, 2009
"Transatlantic Hope" Joast, 2010
"Won Over Frequency" Gavin Castleton, 2010
"Paper Anchors" Jarrett Killen, 2010
"Accidental Thief" Matt the Electrician, 2011
"Sleeping Bag" Jordan Moser, 2012 
"Circus Heart" Rebecca Loebe, 2012
"Kaleidoscope" David Karsten Daniels, 2016
"Christmas Street" Bob Schneider, 2016

The Voice

References

External links
 

Living people
Musicians from Austin, Texas
The Voice (franchise) contestants
21st-century American singers
Place of birth missing (living people)
Singer-songwriters from Texas
American people of English descent
American people of Dutch descent
Year of birth missing (living people)